Lemper is an Indonesian savoury snack made of glutinous rice filled with seasoned shredded chicken, fish abon (meat floss) or serundeng. The specific lemper filled with seasoned shredded chicken is called  lemper ayam (lit: chicken lemper). The meat filling is rolled inside the rice, in a fashion similar to an egg roll; this is in turn rolled and wrapped inside a banana leaf, oil paper, plastic sheet or tinfoil to make a packet ready for serving. If banana leaf is not available, corn husk can be used. Lemper are most often seen as snacks, but may sometimes be served as appetizers as well. Lemper usually have an elongated shape, similar to lontong.

Lemper is very similar to arem-arem and bakcang (Chinese zongzi), and also resembles Japanese onigiri.

Ingredients and cooking method
The glutinous rice is soaked and cooked with coconut milk and salt. The filling is made of shredded chicken breast, chicken stock, garlic, candle nut, ground coriander, cumin, brown sugar, vegetable oil, minced shallot, coconut milk, kaffir lime leaves, salt and pepper. Other than chicken, shredded fish, abon (beef meat floss) or serundeng might be used as filling. When the cooked glutinous rice is cool enough to handle, the chicken filling is placed on the glutinous rice and rolled in a banana leaf, wrapped and secured with biting or lidi semat, a small wooden "needle" made of coconut leaf mid rib or bamboo. Then these banana leaf packages are steamed or grilled. This releases a distinct pleasant aroma of toasted banana leaf.

Semar mendem

A variant snack almost identical to lemper is called semar mendem. Both are glutinous rice filled with shredded seasoned chicken. Instead of banana leaf wrapping, semar mendem uses a thin omelette made from egg and flour as wrapper, hence rendering the whole package edible.

See also 

 Lamprais
 List of steamed foods
 Nasi bakar
 Onigiri
 Rempah udang
 Tamales

References

External links
Lemper recipe
Lemper ayam recipe

Indonesian rice dishes
Glutinous rice dishes
Kue
Steamed foods
Stuffed dishes